Takht Sri Patna Sahib also known as Takhat Sri Harimandir Ji, Patna Sahib, is one of the five takhts of the Sikhs, located in Patna, Bihar, India.  The construction of the takht was commissioned by Maharaja Ranjit Singh in the 18th century to mark the birthplace of Guru Gobind Singh. Due to the damages caused by an earthquake in 1934, the building was rebuilt between 1948 and 1957 for ₹20,00,000. The current acting jathedar of Takht Patna Sahib is Baldev Singh, who was appointed by Harpreet Singh, the acting jathedar of the Akal Takht on 2 December 2022.

Guru Gobind Singh, the tenth Sikh Guru, was born in Patna, Mughal Empire on 22 December 1666. He also spent his early years here before moving to Anandpur Sahib. Besides being the birthplace of Gobind Singh, Patna was also honored by the visits of Guru Nanak and Guru Tegh Bahadur.

Jathedars 

This is a list of jathedars of Takhat Sri Harmandir Ji, Patna Sahib:
 Iqbal Singh 
 Ranjit Singh 
 Baldev Singh

Presidents 
This is a list of presidents of the Takhat Sri Harmandir Ji, Patna Sahib Prabandhak Committee:

Gallery

See also
Golden Temple
350th Prakash Parv

References

External links 

 Official website of Takhat Sri Patna Sahib

Religious buildings and structures in Patna
Gurdwaras in Bihar
Religious tourism in India
18th-century gurdwaras